Gabriel Ulldahl (born 24 October 1988) is a Swedish badminton player who affiliate with Västra Frölunda team. He was the silver medalist at the 2007 European Junior Championships in the boys' singles event. Ulldahl won four men's singles title at the Swedish National Championships.

Achievements

European Junior Championships 
Boys' singles

BWF International Challenge/Series (3 runners-up) 
Men's singles

  BWF International Challenge tournament
  BWF International Series tournament
  BWF Future Series tournament

References

External links 
 

1988 births
Living people
People from Vänersborg Municipality
Swedish male badminton players
Sportspeople from Västra Götaland County